Red House, London may mean

 The Red House, Bexleyheath, designed by the Arts and Crafts architect Philip Webb for William Morris in 1859
 The Red House, Bayswater, designed by the British Queen Anne Revival architect J. J. Stevenson for himself in 1874
 The Red House, Byron Hill Road, Harrow, designed by E. S. Prior in Queen Anne Revival style in 1883